Maun is an island in the Adriatic Sea located southwest of Pag and northeast of Olib.

References

Further reading

External links
 https://web.archive.org/web/20110713062240/http://www.islands-croatia.com/north-adriatic-islands/island-maun-2/

Islands of the Adriatic Sea
Islands of Croatia